Jinmalu station is an interchange station between Line 2 and Line 4 of the Nanjing Metro. It is located to the north of Jinma Road and south of Benma Road, parallel to Shishi Road in Qixia District. It started operations on 28 May 2010 along with the rest of Line 2; the interchange with Line 4 opened on 18 January 2017 along with the rest of that line.

The  of the Shanghai–Wuhan–Chengdu high-speed railway and the Shanghai–Nanjing intercity railway will be located next to Jinmalu Station.

References 

Railway stations in Jiangsu
Nanjing Metro stations
Railway stations in China opened in 2010